Christos Tsiolkas is an Australian author, playwright, and screenwriter. He is especially known for The Slap, which was both well-received critically and highly successful commercially. Several of his books have been adapted for film and television.

Early life
Tsiolkas was born and raised in Melbourne with his Greek immigrant parents, and was educated at Blackburn High School. Tsiolkas completed his Arts Degree at the University of Melbourne in 1987.

He edited the student newspaper Farrago in 1987.

Career
Tsiolkas' first novel, Loaded (1995), about an alienated closet gay youth in Melbourne, was adapted as the feature film Head On (1998) by director Ana Kokkinos, starring Alex Dimitriades.

His fourth novel, The Slap, was published in 2008, and won several awards as well as being longlisted for the Man Booker Prize and shortlisted for the Miles Franklin Literary Award. It was also highly successful commercially; it was the fourth-highest selling book by an Australian author in 2009.

Awards
1999: AWGIE Award for Stage, for Who’s Afraid of the Working Class? (with Andrew Bovell, Patricia Cornelius, and Melissa Reeves)
2006: The Age Fiction Book of the Year#Fiction (or Imaginative Writing) Award
2009: Commonwealth Writers Prize, overall winner for best book, for The Slap
2009: ALS Gold Medal, for The Slap
2009: Nielsen BookData Booksellers' Choice Award, for The Slap
2009: ABIA Book of the Year.
2009: Victorian Premier's Literary Awards, Vance Palmer Prize for Fiction, for The Slap
2020: Victorian Premier's Prize for Fiction, for Damascus (2019)
2021: Melbourne Prize for Literature

Personal life
Tsiolkas is a Richmond Football Club supporter and gay.

Books
 Loaded (1995)
 Jump Cuts (with Sasha Soldatow, 1996)
 The Jesus Man (1999)
 The Devil's Playground (2002)
 Dead Europe (2005)
 The Slap (2008)
 Barracuda (2013)
 Merciless Gods (2014)
 Damascus (2019)
 7 1/2 (2021)

Theatre
 Who's Afraid of the Working Class? (with Andrew Bovell, Melissa Reeves and Patricia Cornelius, 1999
 Elektra AD (1999)
 Viewing Blue Poles (2000)
 Fever (with Andrew Bovell, Melissa Reeves and Patricia Cornelius, 2002)
 Dead Caucasians (2002)
 Non Parlo di Salo (with Spiro Economopoulos, 2005)
  The Hit (with Netta Yashin 2006)

Screenplays
 Thug (short film, with Spiro Economopoulos, 1998)
 Saturn's Return (2001), a telemovie starring Joel Edgerton and Damian Walshe-Howling
 Little Tornadoes (2021), co-written with director Aaron Wilson

Film and TV adaptations
The play Who's Afraid of the Working Class? (1999) was made into the film Blessed (2009), directed by Ana Kokkinos.
 The 2006 novel Dead Europe was made into the film Dead Europe (2012), directed by Tony Krawitz and starring Kodi Smit-McPhee.
The Slap has been turned into both an Australian and U.S. television miniseries.
Barracuda was adapted for television in 2016.

Footnotes

References

External links

20th-century Australian dramatists and playwrights
20th-century Australian male writers
20th-century Australian novelists
20th-century Australian LGBT people
21st-century Australian dramatists and playwrights
21st-century Australian male writers
21st-century Australian novelists
21st-century Australian LGBT people
ALS Gold Medal winners
Australian gay writers
Australian LGBT novelists
Australian male dramatists and playwrights
Australian male novelists
Australian people of Greek descent
Australian social commentators
Australian LGBT dramatists and playwrights
Living people
People educated at Blackburn High School
University of Melbourne alumni
Writers about activism and social change
Writers from Melbourne
Year of birth missing (living people)